Idjwi, or Ijwi, is an inland island in Lake Kivu which forms part of South Kivu Province in the Democratic Republic of the Congo. Idjwi is roughly equidistant between the Congo and Rwanda, with  separating its western shore from the DRC mainland and a similar distance between its eastern shore and the coastline of Rwanda. The island's southern tip, however, lies only  from a promontory of the Rwandan coast.

History 
Historically a clan-based Bahavu society, Idjwi island became a kingdom in the late 18th century (roughly between 1780 and 1840).

Demographics 
In 2013, the island was estimated to have a population of 252,000, mostly Havus, with a small Pygmy minority. This is a massive increase from the estimated population of 50,000 in 1983. 

Malnutrition is common, especially among children, and almost all of the population is dependent on subsistence agriculture.

References

Citations

Islands of the Democratic Republic of the Congo
Lake Kivu
Populated places on Lake Kivu
Lake islands of Africa
Populated places in South Kivu
Geography of Rwanda